Akbarabad-e Kazemi (also Romanized as Akbarābād-e Kāẓemī; also known as Akbarābād) is a village in Jalilabad Rural District, Jalilabad District, Pishva County, Tehran Province, Iran. At the 2006 census, its population was 57, in 14 families.

References 

Populated places in Pishva County